Sarajevo Open Centre, abbreviated SOC, is an independent feminist civil society organisation and advocacy group which campaigns for lesbian, gay, bisexual, trans and intersex (LGBTI) people and women's rights in Bosnia and Herzegovina. The organization also gives asylum and psychological support to victims of discrimination and violence.

The Pink Report is an annual report made by the organization on the state of the Human Rights of LGBTI People in the country and is supported by the Norwegian Embassy.

Publications

References

External links
 

LGBT political organizations
Human rights organizations based in Bosnia and Herzegovina